"Little One" is a song written by Cole Porter for the 1956 film High Society, where it was introduced by Bing Crosby.

Sol C. Siegel, the producer of the film High Society, paid Cole Porter $250,000 for his first original film score in eight years. Besides Louis Armstrong, the cast included Bing Crosby, Frank Sinatra, Grace Kelly and Celeste Holm.

In the film, Crosby (playing a songwriter) is asked by the young sister of the Grace Kelly character to write a song for her and "Little One" is made up on the spot and sung by Crosby.

Notable recordings
Bing Crosby - High Society (Recorded January 6, 1956 with Johnny Green and his MGM Studio Orchestra)

References

Songs from High Society (1956 film)
Songs written by Cole Porter
Bing Crosby songs
1955 songs